Melvyn Gale (born 15 January 1952) is an English cellist.

Career
Born in London, Gale attended the Royal Academy of Music and the Guildhall School of Music and Drama. He played his first professional concert with the London Palladium Orchestra in 1970. He also played with the Bolshoi and Rambert Ballet companies, the London Youth Symphony Orchestra, and various West End shows.
 
He was a cellist for the Electric Light Orchestra from 1975, replacing Mike Edwards. He is also an accomplished pianist, performing piano on "Wild West Hero" as well as occasionally live on "Roll Over Beethoven".

In 1979, he appeared in the Discovery music video playing alongside the rest of the classic line-up (Mik Kaminski on violin and Hugh McDowell on cello) for the last time. He remained with the group until Jeff Lynne removed the string players from the line-up.

Gale and his friend Frank Wilson built a recording studio in 1979. On 12 April 1980, their first album was released under the name Wilson Gale & Co. and was titled Gift Wrapped Set. The album was recorded at Ramport Studios and was released on Jet Records.

Gale ran a company which manufactured CDs and vinyl records for 18 years.

Personal life
Gale is a father of three children. He lives in Northamptonshire, teaching cello and piano.

References

External links
Biography of Gale 
 Biography of ELO

1952 births
Living people
Alumni of the Guildhall School of Music and Drama
Alumni of the Royal Academy of Music
British rock cellists
British pop cellists
Electric Light Orchestra members
Male actors from London
English pianists
English classical cellists
English classical pianists
Male classical pianists
Musicians from London
English cellists
English classical musicians